Stelvio Cipriani (20 August 1937 – 1 October 2018), also known as Viostel, was an Italian composer, mostly of motion picture soundtracks.

Biography

Though not raised with a strong musical upbringing, as a child Cipriani was fascinated by his church's organ.  His priest gave Cipriani his first music lessons and encouraged the boy and his family. Cipriani attended the Santa Cecilia Conservatory starting at the age of 14. Around this time, he played in cruise ship bands, enabling him to meet Dave Brubeck.  Upon returning to Italy, he began working as piano accompaniment for Rita Pavone.

Cipriani's first soundtrack was for the Spaghetti Western The Bounty Killer (1966). This was followed by his more widely known score for The Stranger Returns (a 1967 film, also known by the alternate titles A Man, a Horse, a Gun and Shoot First, Laugh Last, starring Tony Anthony). Cipriani would go on to compose other Spaghetti Western scores and also began composing poliziottesco soundtracks.

Cipriani became prolific in the Italian film world, eventually garnering a Nastro d'Argento for Best Score award for The Anonymous Venetian (1970). Furthermore, one of Cipriani's most famous scores would come about in 1973, the soundtrack for La polizia sta a guardare (The Great Kidnapping). The main theme was recycled by Cipriani in 1977 for the score to Tentacoli. This track was brought to the public's attention again in 2007 when it was featured in Quentin Tarantino's Death Proof. Some of the themes from La polizia sta a guardare were also used by Hélène Cattet & Bruno Forzani in the soundtrack for their first feature Amer. Cipriani was also noted for his score of the 1979 film The Concorde Affair.

In a 2007 interview, Cipriani said that he had composed music for Pope John Paul II and was working with Pope Benedict XVI.

In 2014 he released his original composition "Anonimo Veneziano" ("To Be the One You Love") with the voice of International Recording Artist Veronica Vitale.

In 2017 he took part in some chapters of the episodic docufilm "Diario Di Bordo, Inside the Outsider," promoted by international recording artist Veronica Vitale.

Selected filmography

References

External links

1937 births
2018 deaths
Italian film score composers
Italian male film score composers
Spaghetti Western composers
Accademia Nazionale di Santa Cecilia alumni
Nastro d'Argento winners
Musicians from Rome